Norman Hezekiah Davis (August 9, 1878 – July 2, 1944) was a U.S. diplomat. He joined the Treasury Department in 1917, serving as President Wilson's chief financial advisor at the Paris Peace Conference. In 1919 he was appointed Assistant Secretary of the Treasury, and the following year became Under Secretary of State.

Biography
He was born in Normandy, Bedford County, Tennessee to successful businessman and distiller McClin H. Davis, who is credited with perfecting the recipe for Cascade Whisky, which is now known as George Dickel. Davis was prepared at the prestigious Webb School in Bell Buckle, TN, and studied at both Stanford and Vanderbilt. Davis briefly ran the Cascade Distillery following his father's death in 1898, but was forced to sell his share of the distillery to the operation's majority owners. 

Norman Davis made millions of dollars from his financial dealings in Cuba from 1902 to 1917, first in partnership with Tillinghast L'Hommedieu Huston, and then as the president of the Trust Company of Cuba. While working in the financial industry, he built close friendships with Henry Pomeroy Davison, an influential partner with J.P. Morgan & Co. and Chairman of the American Red Cross, and Richard M. Bissell, president of Hartford Fire Insurance and a member of the National Defense Commission. Through these connections, he was able to get appointed as a financial adviser to the Secretary of Treasury on foreign loans during World War I.

Davis headed a commission of the League of Nations that negotiated the Klaipėda Convention in 1924. He was a delegate to the first General Conference for the Limitation and Reduction of Armaments at Geneva that opened in February, 1932. Shortly after the Disarmament Conference resumed in the Spring of 1933, he arrived in Geneva, and began serving as Chairman of the American delegation with the rank of Ambassador, having been appointed to that position by the incoming Roosevelt administration. 

In a May 22, 1933 address to the Disarmament Conference at Geneva Davis said, "We feel the ultimate objective should be to reduce armaments... through successive stages down to the level of a domestic police force." He was chairman of the International Federation of Red Cross and Red Crescent Societies from 1938 to 1944 and president of the Council on Foreign Relations 1936–1944. He was a member of the Peabody Awards Board of Jurors from 1940 to 1942.

In 1939, following the outbreak of war in Europe, Davis chaired the steering committee of the Council on Foreign Relations' War and Peace Studies project, created to advise the U.S. Government on wartime policy. He joined the State Department's committee on overseas war measures, the fifteen-member Advisory Committee on Problems of Foreign Relations.

References

External links

Red Cross Biography
American Red Cross Biography
 

1878 births
1944 deaths
20th-century American diplomats
American Red Cross personnel
Presidents of the Council on Foreign Relations
People from Bedford County, Tennessee
Presidents of the International Federation of Red Cross and Red Crescent Societies
Stanford University alumni
United States Under Secretaries of State
Vanderbilt University alumni
Webb School (Bell Buckle, Tennessee) alumni